Metzger is a census-designated place and unincorporated community, in Washington County, Oregon, United States. As of the 2010 census, the CDP population was 3,765. It is named for Herman Metzger, who platted the community. It is a suburb located within Portland, Oregon.

History 
Herman Metzger platted the community, which was actively marketed from 1908–1909. The main line of the Oregon Electric Railway passed through the community, and had a stop that was located off Locust Street east of Jefferson.

Geography

Washington Square, a major shopping mall, lies immediately west of Metzger.

Demographics

As of the census of 2010, there were 3,765 people, 1,631 households, and 928 families residing in the CDP. The population density was 5,118.5 people per square mile (1,976.3/km2). There were 1,735 housing units at an average density of 2,853.7 per square mile (1,101.8/km2). The racial makeup of the CDP was 80.1% White, 3.1% Asian, 2.8% African American, 0.8% Native American, 2.1% Pacific Islander, 6.6% from other races, and 4.4% from two or more races. Hispanic or Latino of any race were 13.7% of the population.

There were 1,631 households, out of which 26.9% had children under the age of 18 living with them, 40.5% were married couples living together, 11.2% had a female householder with no husband present, and 43.1% were non-families. 33.1% of all households were made up of individuals, and 10.2% had someone living alone who was 65 years of age or older. The average household size was 2.31 and the average family size was 2.95.

In the CDP, the population was spread out, with 22.6% under the age of 18, 8.0% from 18 to 24, 2.4% from 25 to 44, 26.5% from 45 to 64, and 10.5% who were 65 years of age or older. The median age was 35.9 years. For every 100 females, there were 98.5 males. For every 100 females age 18 and over, there were 94.0 males.

The median income for a household in the CDP in 2017 was $52,852, and the median income for a family was $63,750. Males had a median income of $52,000 versus $39,940 for females. The per capita income for the CDP was $34,905. About 13.1% of families and 13.2% of the population were below the poverty line, including 12.3% of those under age 18 and 15.5% of those age 65 or over.

See also
Tualatin Valley Fire and Rescue

References

Census-designated places in Oregon
German-American culture in Oregon
Portland metropolitan area
Unincorporated communities in Washington County, Oregon
Census-designated places in Washington County, Oregon
Unincorporated communities in Oregon